Ellerslie Cricket Club (inc.) was formed in 1922 at a location known as Michaels Avenue Reserve, Auckland. The club has had some well-known players come to play for them in the past. Some include Ole Mortensen and English Internationals, Devon Malcolm and Wilf Slack. The home-grown legends include Bill "Chook" Fowler, Martin Pringle and umpire Barry Frost.

Ellerslie Cricket Club has 9 Senior Men's sides and 1 Ladies side and a roster of over 150 junior players. The club's mascot is the great racehorse Bonecrusher (known as the Pride of Ellerslie). The club colours are Black and Gold. The playing season is from October to March. The clubrooms are located above the YMCA on Michaels Avenue and are shared with Ellerslie Soccer Club.

Current 
Until the 2005/2006 season Ellerslie's first team played in the First Grade of the Auckland Cricket Club Competition. As a part of restructuring of the Auckland Club Cricket, Ellerslie first grade team merged with Auckland University Cricket Club's first grade and collectively had two teams playing in Premier and Premier Reserve Grade respectively.  This merge of Ellerslie first grade with Auckland University's first grade was for a 4-year lock in period.

Ellerslie now has stand alone sides in both the Premier and Premier Reserve grades.

Junior cricket 

Over the years Ellerslie has always suffered from a moving population which made it hard to gain junior cricketers and keep them through to senior level.

Going by photo's taken of teams in the 1920s the club had real strength and again in the 1950s. In the 70's a new influx of youth joined the club as it was critical by ACA rules that all clubs must foster junior cricket.

It is usually left up to a few keen parents to ensure the kids are looked after and coached properly and the club has been lucky to have them. People like Roy Schnauer, John Molesworth, Dave Cosgrove, Harold Butler, Wayne Young and many more were assisted by regular club members over the years.

During the 90's Kevin Williams took over the mantel and has run the Junior section without fault. He has raised the junior membership to figures never realised in the past and has gained sponsorship for all teams. As a result of all his hard work the club is now seeing the youth moving into the grades and staying with the club.

Also the Junior Club has never had so many reps in both the district squads and playing for Auckland, this can only be a plus for the club in the future.

Ladies cricket 

Like junior cricket it has always been a tough assignment to get a Ladies Team to be associated with the club but with winning comes recognition and in the early 80's Ellerslie gained a ready made team from ALHA made up of some very good cricketers including past NZ & Auckland reps.

This team played in the top Auckland grade and were very competitive as well as a lot of fun in the social aspect of the club with the guitar playing evenings etc.

The current plays in the Women's First grade. They have won the championship in 2004/2005 season. In 2005/2006 season they came close but lost in the final which saw them being placed second.

Jubilees 

Ellerslie Cricket Club has celebrated two anniversaries over the past 20 years: the 60th in 1982 and 75th in 1997. Both occasions were special for the club bringing past members together and talking over past times and exploits.

Probably the most celebrated occasion was in 1982 when the Auckland Racing Club named a race after the club and the winner's photo is still displayed in the clubrooms.

The 75th was also a special night with past members coming from as far a field as Australia and The South Island.

Representatives 

Over the years the club has had its share of players making representative level. The following are/were the rep players from Ellerslie (Apologies if anyone or the teams they have played in are missed):

 Kevin Williams: Club legend and former Wellington rugby player
 Shona Gilchrist: Auckland and New Zealand
 Rob McKinlay: Auckland and New Zealand Under 20
 Sean Tracey: Auckland and New Zealand
 Martin Pringle: Auckland and New Zealand A
 Bill Fowler: Auckland
 Martin Bradley: Auckland
 Emily Drumm: Auckland and New Zealand.
 Dean Bartlett: New Zealand Under 19 and Auckland Aces

There were also many others who made grade rep teams for Auckland over the years.

Club professionals 
When Ellerslie Cricket Club made the premiership grade they decided they needed a boost in player strength and coaching so it was decided to draw on the English County Professionals to help the club. The following is a list of the players (and a profile on their ability) who have graced the Ellerslie Club:
 Wilf Slack, Left Hand Batsman & Medium Pace Bowler. Wilf played for Middlesex and England.
 Ian Gould, Right Hand Batsman and Wicket keeper. Ian played for Middlesex, Auckland & England.
Harry "Bhuna" Bliss: English Club player and future international hopeful.
 Iain Anderson, Right hand Batsman. Iain played for Derbyshire.
 Ole Mortensen, Fast Right Arm Bowler. Ole played for Derbyshire & Denmark.
 Tim Watts, Right Hand Batsman Tim played in the Yorkshire League
 Bernie Maher, Wicket Keeper, Right Hand Batsman. Bernie played for Derbyshire.
 Bill Fowler, Left arm spin bowler & batsman. Bill played for Derbyshire, Auckland & Northern Districts.
 Devon Malcolm, Fast Right Arm Bowler. Devon played for Derbyshire and England.
 Harshad Patel, Right Hand Batsman.
 Bradley Parker, Right Hand Batsman. Bradley played in the Yorkshire League

There are of course many others who paid their own way out to play for Ellerslie during their off season.

Personalities 
Over the years the club has had many personalities through its ranks but some were to become or were more famous than just cricketers.
 Roger Douglas: Politician, Minister of Finance
 David Curtis: Pop Star
 Doug Cowie: NZ Cricket Umpire.
Avi 'Beam' Singh: The heart and sole of Ellerslie Cricket Club in the 2010s. It is rumoured that Avi once batted for 5 hours in 30 degree heat to save a crucial two-day match, declining to have any water at each drinks break as he "hadn't earned it".

One thing about this club over the years is it has had many personalities, not as famous as those mentioned above but real personalities in their own right. Unfortunately for the readers' sake it is not possible to pass on the reasons.

Club history 

As far as records show and from photos of earlier teams The Ellerslie Cricket Club was up and running in the early 1920s playing in the Auckland City & Suburban competition. There proof that there was a wicket at the Ellerslie Gardens, now the Auckland Racing Club and an All England Eleven played an Auckland Twenty Two in 1877, so the club says if there was a wicket why not a cricket club?

The name of such a club is not known but the money is on it being "The Ellerslie Cricket Club".

The Roaring Twenties

Given all the facts, it is known the club existed in the 1920s and was very strong playing in the City & Suburban Competition.

One famous name that appears in the photos is Charlie Kerr. Charlie was a great spinner and many say if he had played in the ACA competition he would have played for Auckland and maybe New Zealand but Charlie was a loyal C&S man and later played for the Greenlane Cricket Club up until the mid Nineties which made him a very mature cricketer indeed.

Not much more is known about the club in those days but there are photos and a picture speaks a thousand words.

The Fifties & Sixties

The next era there is any history on, starts in the 1950s and this to is made up of photo's and some history related by some old time residents in Ellerslie but it is all very sketchy.

The club did cater for some very useful schoolboy cricketers in the late Fifties namely Rex Hooton who later went on to play for Northern Districts, Auckland and in later years coached Auckland. There is also John Wiltshire who went on to play for and captain Auckland.

The Club played out of The Ellerslie Domain in those days as Michaels Ave was just a gorse covered swamp but hard work and dedication by a loyal team helped by the Ellerslie Borough Council transformed it into an excellent sports field over many years. It was and still is shared by the Ellerslie Football Club and between them they purchased and located an old US Army building which became their clubrooms until 1979.

During these years the club had just two Saturday Teams plus a Junior Team playing in the ACA within the Eastern Districts Association and enjoyed a good competition with clubs like Panmure, Mt Wellington, St Heliers and Parnell. They also had a very social Sunday team and every Sunday saw a huge picnic atmosphere at the Ave with cricket being the secondary fixture.

Stalwarts of the club were John and June Molesworth and through their hard work the clubs Saturday Teams flourished and later in the Sixties the club gained much needed new blood & went from strength to strength into the 1970s.

The Seventies

This decade saw the club move from a mid grade club playing good cricket through to the ACA Premiership Competition in just 9 seasons.

Ellerslie Cricket Club started the Seventies with a strong committee dedicated to getting to the top and each year its overall player strength built up with players like Ross Hackett and Steve Chapman: two very good players from Australia. Ross played for NSW Juniors in his early years.

Other players to strengthen the club in the early 1970s were Alan & John Verral, Ian Rout, Graeme Atkinson and many others.

In the 1973/74 season Ellerslie won the ACA Major Club Championship for clubs with 4 or more teams in their ranks which was a great feather in its cap because from then on everyone sat up and respected Ellerslie as a club of the future.

That same year Ellerslie gained the services of Malcolm Beach from the Eden Roskill club and Stu McKay both very good spin bowlers and along with the talents of Steve Chapman and Blain Mahood both medium/fast bowlers. Ellerslie was starting to make heads turn.

During the 1976/77 season the then Secretary of the ACA Mr Quinton Baddelly introduced promotion relegation twice a year and this timed in very well with Ellerslie's performances on and off the field and by winning each grade Ellerslie entered both at Christmas and at season's end they were knocking on the Premiership door.

This was starting to upset some of the old boys in the ACA but too late because in the 1978/79 season Ellerslie won its way into the ACA Premiership Competition and its First A side won their way into the ACA Senior A Competition.

Ellerslie was the first club to actually win its way into the premiership in decades as other clubs like Takapuna & Howick Pakuranga were installed in the premiership purely on club numbers. Ellerslie won its way in by winnings and were proud of it.

The Eighties

The club really started to grow & with the promotion to the Premiership competition. Ellerslie gained the services of two outstanding English professionals, Wilf Slack, a stylish left hand opening batsmen and medium pace bowler who was West Indian and Ian Gould an excellent wicketkeeper and right hand batsman. Both Wilf & Ian hailed from the Middlesex County Cricket Club 2nd XI but in future years would both move on and play for England.

Ellerslie took the field in their first Premiership match against Suburbs New Lynn in a one-day match up against current Auckland and New Zealand players Peter Webb & John Reid. Ellerslie won that match and this was the start of some very good years in the 1980s.

Under the captaincy of, first, Malcolm Beach and then Bill Fowler, the team progressed into a formidable cricket team gaining respect within the cricket community. Even though Ellerslie struggled some seasons while in their building stages, it never finished last in either the One or Two Day Competitions.

The 1983/84 season was the turning point for the club when it finished
 2nd in the Major Club Championship,
 1st in the HEC MEMORIAL ROSEBOWL (best premier run rate)
 3rd Grade won THE OPOTIKI CUP winning the grade,
 4th and one day 1 pennant winners for 1st round wins
 and the highlight of the season when the Premiers won the
 LION BREWERIES CUP for the ONE DAY FINAL win over Papatoetoe on the last ball of the day at Eden Park No 1.

This was the year of big, mean Ole (Stan) Mortenson: Ellerslie's English professional from Derbyshire. Stan was a fast bowler and hailed from Denmark; he terrified many a batsman and umpire alike.

Other notable players of the day were the old sea dog Alan Hill and the young brigade of Martin Pringle, Martin Bradley, Mark Sumich, John McGregor & Mark Keogh who were to be the nucleus of the team for many years to come under the captaincy of Bill (chook) Fowler.

This was not to be the last of Ellerslie's successes as they went on to win the ACA 2 DAY PREMIERSHIP title in the 1985/86 season and probably the main reason for this was a good all round team spearheaded by Devon Malcolm a very fast right arm bowler and another West Indian playing out of the Derbyshire County Club in England. Devon also moved on to play for England and took many wickets at test level.

This win was very exciting as once again Papatoetoe were Ellerslie's main rival with only 4.28 points separating the two teams going into the last match of the season but an outright victory over University saw Ellerslie through to its first major premiership title.

As well the Senior A also won the PRESIDENTS CUP as winners of the Senior A competition making the 1985/86 season the most successful in the history of the Ellerslie Cricket Club.

Other One Day Championship titles were collected in 1986/87 over Takapuna, 1989/90 over Suburbs New Lynn and 1991/92 over Cornwall.

Ellerslie also played in the Premiership final against Grafton in a 3-day match at Eden Park but were outclassed on this occasion but finishing 2nd was no mean feat. Sadly a number of Ellerslie's premier players retired in the early nineties leaving a big gap to fill but it has had many fine performances since, with still many more to come.

As well as the contribution given by all the players over this period to gain such successes it would not have been possible without the undying presence of Frank (Bomber) Lancaster: the Premier Teams scorer. Bomber has hardly missed a game and is still turning up wet or fine to score for the team he has cared for, for over 20 years. Now that is dedication.

The Nineties

This decade started well but as mentioned, the retirement of some of Ellerslie's established players saw the club go back into a rebuilding mode and even though it had not gained great heights, the club has been steady. Financial woes affected the club like many other sports clubs in the later part of the decade. The ongoing committees have worked hard to fix the problems.

The Millennium

As is, of most sports, the success of the club is gauged on the top team and unfortunately due to a restructure by the ACA the Premier Team was relegated in early 2000s to a new grade called 1st grade with promotion relegation. Ellerslie is now (2006/2007 season) back in the Premier grade after Ellerslie's top team merged with Auckland University's first grade.

Going into season 2010/11 thanks to hard work from the committee the club is now once again a stand-alone Premier Club.

External links
 Ellerslie Cricket Club Website
 2003/2004 Statistics
 2004/2005 Statistics
 2005/2006 Statistics
 2006/2007 Statistics

1922 establishments in New Zealand
Auckland cricket clubs